McKinley Nunatak is the southernmost of three large nunataks in upper Liv Glacier, Antarctica, about  north-northeast of Barnum Peak. It was named by the Southern Party of the New Zealand Geological Survey Antarctic Expedition (1961–62) for Captain Ashley C. McKinley, a photographer with Rear Admiral Richard E. Byrd on his South Pole flight of 1929.

References

Nunataks of the Ross Dependency
Dufek Coast